The Charlotte Harbor Light was placed at a bend in the deeper part of Charlotte Harbor to guide ships to the railroad docks in Punta Gorda, Florida. Punta Gorda lost importance as a port when railroad lines reached Boca Grande on the southern end of Gasparilla Island at the entrance to Charlotte Harbor in 1906. The lighthouse steadily deteriorated and had to be demolished in 1943. The iron pilings were removed in 1975.

References

Charlotte Harbor Lighthouse History - accessed June 29, 2008

Lighthouses completed in 1890
Houses completed in 1890
Lighthouses in Florida
1890 establishments in Florida
1943 disestablishments in Florida